The NC State Wolfpack softball team represents North Carolina State University in NCAA Division I college softball.  The team participates in the Atlantic Coast Conference. The Wolfpack are currently led by head coach Jennifer Patrick-Swift. The team plays its home games at Curtis & Jacqueline Dail Softball Stadium located on the university's campus.

History

Coaching history

Year-by-year results

Championships

Conference Championships

Conference Tournament Championships

see Atlantic Coast Conference softball tournament

Coaching staff

References

 
Softball
Atlantic Coast Conference softball